Yılgayah (Turkish: Yılgayak, Azerbaijanese: İlqayax; means "Year-Passing") or Ulugh-Kun ("Great Day" in Old and Middle Turkic) was the spring festival of Turkic shamanism. It was celebrated on or about March 22, and marked the first day of the Turkic month of Oshlaq-ay. The holiday was celebrated with feasting and probably with sacrificial rites. 
The name of the holiday appears in the medieval dictionary Divan-i Lughat-it-Turk by Mahmud Kashgari, written in the 1070s.

Sleep of Universe
Yılgayah is a traditional Turkic holiday, which celebrates the New Year, and the coming of Spring. That night, at that moment everything sleeps for an instant. Back then wakes up the universe.

Yılgayah is a family holiday. In the evening before the holiday the whole family gathers around the holiday table laid with various dishes to make the New Year rich. The holiday goes on for several days and ends  festive public dancing and other entertainment of folk bands, contests of national sports.

In Azerbaijan culture
Usually preparation for Yılgayah begins a month prior to the festival. In rural areas crop holidays are marked. Each of forthcoming 4 weeks is devoted to one of the four elements and called accordingly in Azerbaijan. Each Tuesday people celebrate the day of one of the four elements - water, fire, earth and wind. People do house cleaning, plant trees, make new dresses, paint eggs, make national pastries such as shakarbura, baklava and a great variety of "national cuisine". Wheat is fried with kishmish (raisins) and nuts (govurga). As a tribute to fire-worshiping every Tuesday during four weeks before the holiday kids jump over small bonfires and candles are lit. On the holiday eve the graves of relatives are visited and tended.

See also
Nowruz

References

Bibliography
Kevin Alan Brook, Kevin Alan, The Jews of Khazaria. 2nd ed. Rowman & Littlefield Publishers, Inc, 2006.

External links 
 Nevruz Nedir? 
 Türklüğün En Eski Bayramı, Necati Demir 
 Turkish Mythology Dictionary - Multilingual (English)
 Nevruz Geleneği ve Kırgızlarda Nevruz, Doğan Kaya 
 Türk Kültüründe Yenigün, Bayram Durbilmez 

Asian shamanism
Religious festivals in Turkey
Turkic mythology
March observances
Shamanistic festivals
Spring (season) events in Turkey